The tribe Broscini is a worldwide group of beetles in the Broscinae subfamily of Carabidae (the ground beetles).

Description 
Broscini is divided into five subtribes:
 Axonyina: 3 genera (Oriental-Palearctic-Neotropical).
 Broscina: 9 genera (Holoarctic-Oriental).
 Nothobroscina: 10 genera (Australian-Neotropical).
 Barypina: 2 genera (Neotropical).
 Creobiina: 11 genera (Australian-Neotropical).

References 
Ball, G. E. (1956). Notes on the genus Zacotus Le Conte, 1869, and on the classification of the tribe Broscini (= Broscidae sensu Jeannel, 1941. Coleoptera, Carabidae). The Coleopterists' Bulletin, 33–52.

 
Beetle tribes